The Murders Abroad Act 1817 (57 Geo 3, c 53) was an Act of the Parliament of the United Kingdom of Great Britain and Ireland. It made it easier for a court to punish "murders or manslaughters committed in places not within His Majesty's dominions", and it received royal assent on 27 June 1817. The act specifically mentioned the Bay of Honduras, New Zealand, and Otaheite (an old name for Tahiti).

Legislation
The original (full) title was: "An Act for the more effectual Punishment of Murders and Manslaughters committed in Places not within His Majesty's Dominions." This was shortened to "The Murders Abroad Act, 1817" by the Short Titles Act 1896. The legislation was passed by Parliament in 1817, and reads in part as such:

The legislation is notable as it contains the first mention of New Zealand in a British statute. It also clarified that New Zealand was not a British colony, despite Captain James Cook having claimed the country on behalf of King George III. The act thus gave Lachlan Macquarie, the Governor of New South Wales, an increased legal authority over New Zealand and offences could be tried in an admiralty court just as if they had been committed at sea.

The jurisdiction of both the Supreme Court of New South Wales and the Supreme Court of Tasmania over New Zealand was initiated in the New South Wales Act 1823 (4 Geo 4, c 96), and lesser offences were included at that time. The Australian Courts Act 1828 (9 Geo 4, c 83) repeated the 1823 wording, but added that the punishment of the offence was to be the same as if the crime had been committed in England.

Repeal
Sections 2 and 3 of the act were repealed by the Statute Law Revision Act 1873. The preamble was repealed by the Statute Law Revision (No. 2) Act 1890.

The Murders Abroad Act 1817 ceased to have any effect in New Zealand after the Crimes Act 1961 commenced on 1 January 1962 after having been passed by the New Zealand Parliament the previous year.

References

External links
Full version of the legislation before any repeals

United Kingdom Acts of Parliament 1817
Repealed United Kingdom Acts of Parliament
Legal history of New Zealand